This list of the Mesozoic life of Mississippi contains the various prehistoric life-forms whose fossilized remains have been reported from within the US state of Mississippi and are between 252.17 and 66 million years of age.

A
 
 
 
 

 Acesta
 †Acesta riddlei
 †Aciculiscala
 †Aciculiscala acuta
 †Aciculiscala coffea
 Acirsa
 †Acirsa clathrata
 †Acirsa culmosa
 †Acirsa flexicostata
 †Acirsa gravida
 †Acirsa implexa
 †Acirsa microstriata – or unidentified comparable form
 †Acirsa wadei
 Acmaea
 †Acrocoelum – tentative report
 †Acrocoelum cereum
 †Acteon
 †Acteon cicatricosus
 †Acteon pistilliformis
 †Acutostrea
 †Acutostrea plumosa
 †Aenona
 †Aenona eufaulensis
  †Agerostrea
 †Agerostrea mesenterica
 †Aliofusus
 †Aliofusus stamineus
  Alvania
 †Alvania tallahatchiensis
 †Amaurellina
 †Amaurellina stephensoni
 †Ambigostrea
 †Ambigostrea tecticosta
  †Ampullina
 †Ampullina lepta
 †Ampullina potens
 Amuletum
 †Amuletum costata
 †Amuletum costatum – tentative report
 †Amuletum dumasensis
 †Amuletum fasciolatum
 †Amuletum limbatum
 †Amuletum macnairyensis
 †Amuletum macnairyensis torquatum
 †Amuletum wadei
 †Anatimya
 †Anatimya anteradiata
 †Anatimya postsulcata
 Anatina
 †Anatina jerseyensis – or unidentified comparable form
 †Anchura
 †Anchura abrupta
 †Anchura chapelvillensis
 †Anchura coffea
 †Anchura corniculata
 †Anchura noakensis – tentative report
 †Anchura substriata
 †Ancilla
 †Ancilla acutula
 †Anisomyon
 †Anomalofusus
 †Anomalofusus lemniscatus
 †Anomalofusus subnodosus
 †Anomia
 †Anomia argentaria
 †Anomia ornata
 †Anomia tellinoides
 †Anomoeodus
 †Anomoeodus latidens – type locality for species
 †Anomoeodus mississippiensis – type locality for species
 †Anomoeodus phaseolus
 Anteglosia
 †Anteglosia tennesseensis
 †Anteglossia
 †Antillocaprina
 †Aphrodina
 †Aphrodina eufaulensis – tentative report
 †Aphrodina regia
 †Aphrodina tippana
 †Arca
 †Arca rostellata
  Architectonica
 †Arcoscalpellum
 †Arcoscalpellum bakeri
 †Arcoscalpellum campus
 †Arcoscalpellum withersi
 †Arctostrea
 †Arctostrea falacata
 Arrhoges
 †Arrhoges plenacosta
 †Ascaulocardium
 †Ascaulocardium armatum
 Astarte
 †Astarte culebrensis
 Ataphrus
 †Ataphrus griffini
  Atractosteus
 †Atreta
 †Atreta melleni

B

  †Baculites
 †Baculites arculus
 †Baculites capensis
 †Baculites grandis – or unidentified comparable form
 †Baculites tippahensis
  Barbatia
 †Barbatia carolinensis
 †Barbatia lintea
 †Bathytormus
 †Bathytormus pteropsis
  †Belemnitella
 †Belemnitella americana
 †Bellifusus
 †Bellifusus angulicostatus
 †Bellifusus curvicostatus
 †Bellifusus curvicostatus crenulatus
 †Bellifusus spinosus
 †Belliscala
 †Belliscala lirata
 †Belliscala nodosa
 †Belliscala rockensis
 †Beretra
 †Beretra gracilis
 †Beretra preclara
 †Beretra ripleyana
 Bernaya
 †Bernaya mississippiensis
  Bittium – tentative report
 †Bizarrus
 †Bizarrus abnormalis
 †Boehmoceras
 †Boehmoceras arculus
 Botula
 †Botula carolinensis
 †Botula ripleyana
 Brachidontes
 †Brachylepas
 †Brachylepas angulosa
 †Breviarca
 †Breviarca umbonata
 †Buccinopsis
 †Buccinopsis crassicostata
 †Buccinopsis crassus
 †Buccinopsis dorothiella
 †Buccinopsis solida
 Bulla – tentative report
 †Bullopsis
 †Bullopsis cretacea
 †Bullopsis demersus

C

 Cadulus
 †Cadulus obnutus
 Caestocorbula
 †Caestocorbula crassaplica
 †Caestocorbula crassiplica
 †Caestocorbula suffalciata
 †Caestocorbula terramaria
 †Calliomphalus
 †Calliomphalus americanus
 †Calliomphalus argenteus
 †Calliomphalus conanti
 †Calliomphalus microcancelli
 †Calliomphalus nudus
 †Calliomphalus paucispirilus
 †Calliomphalus tuberculosus
 Calyptraea
 †Camptonectes
 †Camptonectes bellisculptus
 †Camptonectes berryi
 †Camptonectes bubonis
 †Camptonectes burlingtonensis
 Cantharus
 †Cantharus lemniscatus
  Capulus
 †Capulus cuthandensis
 †Capulus spangleri
  Carcharias – tentative report
 
 †Cardium spillmani
  Caryophyllia
 †Caryophyllia konincki – type locality for species
 †Catopygus
 †Catopygus mississippiensis – type locality for species
 †Caveola
 †Caveola acuta
  Ceratia
 †Ceratia cylindrata
  Cerithiella
 †Cerithiella – type locality for species – informal
 †Cerithiella aequalirata
 †Cerithiella chapelvillensis
 †Cerithiella nodoliratum
 †Cerithiella semirugatum
 †Cerithioderma
 †Cerithioderma nodosa
  Cerithium
 †Cerithium binodosus
 †Cerithium cretaceus
 †Cerithium nodoliratum
 †Cerithium robustus
 †Cerithium semirugatum
 †Cerithium weeksi
 Chlamys
 †Chlamys mississippensis
  †Chondrites
  Cidaris
 †Cidaris wahalakensis
 †Clarkiella
 †Clarkiella hemispherica
 Clavagella
 †Clavipholas
 †Clavipholas pectorosa
 Cliona
 †Clisocolus
 †Clisocolus concentricum
 †Coahuilites – tentative report
 †Colombellina
 †Colombellina americana
 †Colombellina cancellata
  Corbula
 †Corbula torta
 †Costellacesta
 †Costellacesta riddlei
 Crassatella
 †Crassatella hodgei
 †Crassatella neusensis
 †Crassatella roodensis
 †Crassatella vadosa
 Crenella
 †Crenella elegantula
 †Crenella serica
 †Creonella
 †Creonella subangulata
 †Creonella triplicata
 †Creonella turretiforma
 †Cretiscalpellum
 †Cretiscalpellum hardnedi
 †Cretiscalpellum vallum
  †Cretolamna
 †Cretolamna appendiculata
 †Cristipluma – type locality for genus
 †Cristipluma mississippiensis – type locality for species
 Crucibulum
  Cucullaea
 †Cucullaea capax
 †Cucullaea carolinensis
 †Cucullaea littlei
 †Cucullaea vulgans
 †Cucullaea wadei – tentative report
 †Cuna
 †Cuna texana
 Cuspidaria
 †Cuspidaria grandis
 †Cuspidaria jerseyensis – or unidentified comparable form
 †Cyclorisma
 †Cyclorisma parva
 Cylichna
 †Cylichna diversilirata
 †Cylichna incisa
 †Cylichna intermissia
 †Cylichna secalina
 †Cylindrotruncatum
 †Cylindrotruncatum demersum
 †Cymbophora
 †Cymbophora appressa
 †Cymbophora berryi
 †Cymbophora lintea
 †Cymella
 †Cymella bella
 †Cymella ironensis – tentative report
 †Cyprimeria
 †Cyprimeria alta
 †Cyprimeria depressa

D
 

 †Dakoticancer
 †Dakoticancer australis
 †Damesia
 †Damesia keownvillensis
 Dasmosmilia
 †Dasmosmilia kochii
 †Dentalium
 †Dentalium leve
 †Deussenia
 †Deussenia bellalirata
 †Deussenia ripleyana
 †Deussenia travisana – or unidentified comparable form
 †Dhondtichlamys
 †Dhondtichlamys venustus
 †Dictyaraea
 Dimya
 †Dimya melleni
 †Diplomoceras
 †Diplomoceras trabeatus
 †Dircella
 †Dircella spillmani
  †Discoscaphites
 †Discoscaphites conradi
 †Discoscaphites iris
  †Dolicholatirus
 †Dolicholatirus torquatus
 †Drepanocheilus
 †Drepanochilus
 †Drepanochilus triliratus
 †Drilluta
 †Drilluta buboanus
 †Drilluta distans
 †Drilluta lemniscata
 †Drilluta major

E

 †Ecclesiogyra
 †Ecclesiogyra heliclina
 †Ecclesiogyra inflata
 †Echinimathilda
 †Echinimathilda corona
 †Echinimathilda microstriata
 †Echinimathilda parvula
  †Ecphora
 †Ecphora proquadricostata
 †Ellipsoscapha
 †Ellipsoscapha mortoni
  †Enchodus
 †Enchodus petrosus
 †Endoptygma
 †Endoptygma leprosa
 †Entomope
 †Entomope ponderi
 †Eoacteon
 †Eoacteon ithyocheilus
 †Eoacteon linteus
 †Eoharpa
 †Eoharpa sinuosa
 Eonavicula
 †Eonavicula rostellata
 †Eothoracosaurus – type locality for genus
 †Eothoracosaurus mississippiensis – type locality for species
 †Epitonium
 †Epitonium faearium
 †Epitonium sillimani
  †Eryma – report made of unidentified related form or using admittedly obsolete nomenclature
 †Eryma flecta
 †Etea
 †Etea carolinensis
 †Eubaculites
 †Eubaculites carinatus
 †Eufistulana
 †Eufistulana ripleyana
 †Eufistulina
 †Eufistulina ripleyana
 †Eulima
 †Eulima clara
 †Eulima coffea
 †Eulima gracilistylis
 †Eulima laevigata
 †Eulima monmouthensis
 †Eulima spirala
 †Euspira
 †Euspira rectilabrum
  †Eutrephoceras
 †Eutrephoceras dekayi
 †Eutrephoceras perlatus
 †Exechocirsus
 †Exechocirsus cowickeensis
  †Exogyra
 †Exogyra costata
 †Exogyra erraticostata
 †Exogyra ponderosa
 †Exogyra upatoiensis

F

 †Flemingostrea
 †Flemingostrea subspatula
 †Fulgerca
 †Fulgerca attenuata – tentative report
 †Fulgerca compressilirata
 †Fusimilis
 †Fusimilis kummeli
 †Fusimilis novemcostatus
 †Fusimilis tippanus
  Fusinus
 †Fusinus macnairyensis

G

 †Gegania
 †Gegania bella
 †Gegania bella prodiga
 †Gegania mississippiensis
 †Gegania parabella
  Gemmula
 †Gemmula cretacea
  †Gervillia
 †Gervilliopsis
 †Gervilliopsis ensiformis
  Ginglymostoma
 †Ginglymostoma globidens
 Glossus
  Glycymeris
 †Glycymeris microsulci
 †Glycymeris rotundata
 †Glycymeris whiteleyensis
 †Glyptoxoceras
 †Goniocylichna
 †Goniocylichna bisculpturata
 †Goniocylichna elongata
 †Graciliala
 †Graciliala calcaris
 †Graciliala decemlirata
 †Graciliala johnsoni
 †Granocardium
 †Granocardium dumosum
 †Granocardium kuemmeli
 †Granocardium kummeli
 †Granocardium lowei
 †Granocardium tippananum
 †Granocardium tippanum
 †Granosolarium
 †Granosolarium coffea
 †Graphidula
 †Graphidula melanopsis
 †Graphidula multicostata
 †Graphidula terebriformis
  †Gryphaea
 †Gryphaea convexa
 †Gryphaeostrea
 †Gryphaeostrea vomer
 †Gymnentome
 †Gymnentome canalis
 †Gymnentome unicarinata
  †Gyrineum
 †Gyrineum gwinae
 Gyrodes
 †Gyrodes abyssinus
 †Gyrodes americanus
 †Gyrodes major
 †Gyrodes petrosus
 †Gyrodes spillmani
 †Gyrodes supraplicatus
 †Gyropleura

H

 †Hadrosaurus – tentative report
 †Hamites
 †Hamulus
 †Hamulus onyx
 †Hamulus ripleyanus
 †Hamulus squamosus
 †Harduinia
 †Harduinia aequorea
 †Harduinia dalli
 †Harduinia mortoni
 †Harduinia mortonis
 †Harduinia weatherbyi
 †Heliacus
 †Heliacus reticulatus
 †Helicaulax
 †Helicaulax formosa
 †Helicoceras
 Hemiaster
 †Hemiaster humphreysanus
 †Hemiaster wetherbyi
 Hemiscyllium
 †Hercorhynchus
 †Hercorhynchus quadriliratus
 †Hercorhyncus
 †Hercorhyncus bicarinatus
 †Hercorhyncus pagodaformis
 †Hercorhyncus tippanus
 †Hercorhyncus triliratus
  †Hoploparia
 †Hoploparia tennesseensis
 Hyala
 †Hyala fragila
  †Hybodus
 †Hydrotribulus
 †Hydrotribulus elegans
 †Hyphantoceras – tentative report
 †Hyphantoceras amapondense
 †Hypolophus
 †Hypolophus mcnultyi

I

  †Inoceramus
 †Inoceramus quadrans – or unidentified comparable form
 †Inoperna
 †Ischyrhiza
 †Ischyrhiza mira

J

 Juliacorbula
 †Juliacorbula monmouthensis

K

 †Kummelia

L

 †Lacrimiforma
 †Lacrimiforma secunda
 Laternula
 †Laternula robusta
 †Latiala
 †Latiala lobata
 †Latiata – tentative report
 †Laxispira
 †Laxispira lumbricalis
 †Laxispira monilifera
 †Lefortia
 †Lefortia trojana – type locality for species
 †Legumen
 †Legumen ellipticum
 †Lemniscolittorina
 †Lemniscolittorina berryi
 †Lemniscolittorina yonkersi
  Lepisosteus
 †Leptosolen
 †Leptosolen biplicata
 Lima
 †Lima deatsvillensis
 †Lima pelagica
 Limatula
 †Limatula acutilineata
 Limopsis
 †Limopsis meeki
 †Limopsis perbrevis
 †Linearis
 †Linearis magnoliensis
 †Linearis metastriata
 †Linearis pectinis
 †Linthia
 †Linthia variabilis
  Linuparus
 †Linuparus canadensis
 †Liopeplum
 †Liopeplum canalis
 †Liopeplum cretaceum
 †Liopeplum leioderma
 †Liopeplum nodosum
 †Liopeplum rugosum
 †Liopeplum spiculatum
 †Liopistha
 †Liopistha protexta
 †Liothyris
 †Liothyris carolinensis
 †Lispodesthes
 †Lispodesthes amplus
  Lithophaga
 †Lomirosa
 †Lomirosa carinata
 †Longitubus
 †Longoconcha
 †Longoconcha dalli
 †Longoconcha imbricatus
 †Longoconcha quadrilirata
 †Longoconcha tennesseensis
  Lopha
 †Lopha falcata
 †Lopha mesenterica
 †Lowenstamia
 †Lowenstamia cucullata
 †Lowenstamia funiculus
 †Lowenstamia liratus
 †Lowenstamia subplanus – or unidentified comparable form
 †Lucina – tentative report
 †Lupira
 †Lupira disparila
 †Lupira pyriformis
 †Lupira turbinea
 †Lycettia
 †Lycettia tippana
 †Lycettia tippanus
 †Lyriochlamys
 †Lyriochlamys cretosa
 †Lyriochlamys cretosus

M

 

 Malletia
 †Malletia longfrons
 †Malletia longifrons
 †Malletia stephensoni
 †Margaritella
 †Margaritella pumila
 †Mataxa
 †Mataxa elegans
 †Mataxa leioderma
 †Mathilda
 †Mathilda cedarensis
 †Mathilda corona
 †Mathilda hexalira
 †Mathilda pentalira
 †Mathilda ripleyana
 †Mathilda unionensis
 †Menabites
 †Menabites danei
 †Menabites delawarensis
 Meretrix – tentative report
 †Mesodendriurn
 †Mesodendriurn oktibbehaensis
 †Micrabacia
 †Micrabacia marylandica – type locality for species
 †Micrabacia radiata – type locality for species
  †Micraster
 †Micraster americanus
  Modiolus
 †Modiolus sedesclaris
 †Modiolus sedesclarus
 †Monroea
 †Monroea coffea
 †Morea
 †Morea corsicanensis
 †Morea corsicanensis depressa
 †Morea marylandica
 †Morea rotunda
 †Morea transenna
  †Mosasaurus
 †Myobarbum
 †Myobarbum laevigatum
 Myrtea
 †Myrtea stephensoni
 †Mytilus – tentative report

N

 †Napulus
 †Napulus fragilis
 †Napulus octoliratus
 †Neamphitomaria
 †Neamphitomaria planospira
 †Neamphitomaria reticulata
 †Neamphitomaria stantoni
 †Neithea
 †Neithea bexarensis
 †Nemoarca
 †Nemocardium
 †Nemocardium fragile
 †Nemodon
 †Nemodon brevifrons
 †Nemodon eufalensis
 †Nemodon eufaulensis
 †Nemodon grandis – or unidentified comparable form
 †Nemodon neusensis
  Nerita
 †Nerita reticulirata
 Neritina
 †Neritina densata – tentative report
 †Nonactaeonina
  †Nostoceras
 †Nostoceras turrilites – tentative report
 †Notopocorystes
 †Notopocorystes testacea
 Nozeba
 †Nozeba crassa
  Nucula
 †Nucula camia
 †Nucula cuneifrons
 †Nucula percrassa
 †Nucula perequalis
 †Nucula stantoni
 Nuculana
 †Nuculana tarensis
 †Nuculana whitfieldi
 †Nudivagus
 †Nymphalucina
 †Nymphalucina linearia
 †Nymphalucina parva

O

 †Odontobasis – tentative report
 †Odontobasis sulcata
 †Oligoptycha
 †Oligoptycha corrugata
 Opaliopsis
 †Opaliopsis angustocota
 †Opertochasma
 †Ornopsis
 †Ornopsis digressa
 †Ornopsis elevata
 †Ornopsis modica
  Ostrea
 †Ostrea sloani

P
 

  †Pachydiscus
  †Pachymelania – tentative report
 †Paladmete
 †Paladmete cancellaria
 †Paladmete gardnerae
 †Paladmete gardnerae pygmaea
 †Paladmete laevis
 †Palaeoxantho – type locality for genus
 †Palaeoxantho libertiensis – type locality for species
 †Paleofusimitra
 †Paleofusimitra elongata
 †Paleopsephaea
 †Paleopsephaea mutabilis
 †Paleopsephaea tenuilirata
 Panopea
 †Panopea monmouthensis
 †Parafusus
 †Parafusus callilateris
 †Parafusus coloratus
 †Parafusus saffordi
 †Paranomia
 †Paranomia scabra
 †Parapaguristes
 †Parapaguristes tuberculatus – type locality for species
 †Parapaguristes whitteni – type locality for species
 †Parmicorbula
 †Parmicorbula suffalciata
 †Parmicorbula terramaria
 †Parmicorbula torta
 †Pauciacirsa
 †Pauciacirsa simplex
 Pecten
 †Pecten venustus
 †Periplomya
 †Periplomya applicata
 †Perissoptera
 †Perissoptera prolabiata mississippiensis
 †Perrisonota
 †Perrisonota protexta
 Phacoides
 †Phacoides mattiformis – tentative report
 †Phelopteria
 †Phelopteria linguaeformis
 †Phelopteria linguiformis
  Pholadomya
 †Pholadomya occidentalis
 †Piestochilus
 †Piestochilus curviliratus
 Pinna
 †Pinna laqueata
  †Placenticeras
 †Placenticeras placenta
 †Placenticeras syrtale
 †Plagiostoma
 †Plagiostoma woodsi
  †Platecarpus – type locality for genus
 †Platecarpus tympaniticus – type locality for species
 †Plectomya
 †Plesiotriton
 †Plesiotriton cretaceus
 †Pleuriocardia
 †Pleuriocardia eufaulense
 Plicatula
 †Plicatula mullicaensis
 †Plicatula tetrica
  Polinices
 †Polinices kummeli
 †Postligata
 †Postligata wordeni
 †Praeleda
 †Praeleda compar
 †Prehepatus
 †Prehepatus harrisi
 †Promathildia
 †Promathildia parvula
 †Protobusycon
 †Protobusycon binodosum
 †Protocallianassa
 †Protocallianassa mortoni
 †Protocardia
 †Protocardia spillmani
 †Protocardia stantoni
 †Pseudoclaviscala
 †Pseudoclaviscala laevicosta
 †Pseudoclaviscala rugacosta
  †Pseudocorax
 †Pseudocorax granti
 †Pseudolimea
 †Pseudolimea reticulata
 †Pseudolimea sellardsi
 Pseudomalaxis
 †Pseudomalaxis pateriformis
 †Pseudomalaxis pilsbryi
 †Pseudomalaxis stantoni
 †Pseudoptera
 †Pseudoschloenbachia
 †Pseudoschloenbachia mexicana
 †Pteria
 †Pteria rhombica
 †Pterocerella
 †Pterocerella maryea
 †Pterocerella poinsettiformis
 †Pterocerella pontotocensis
 †Pterocerella tippana
  †Pterotrigonia
 †Pterotrigonia angulicostata
 †Pterotrigonia bartrami
 †Pterotrigonia eufalensis
 †Pterotrigonia eufaulensis
 †Pterotrigonia thoracia
 †Pterotrigonia thoracica
  †Ptychodus
 †Ptychodus mortoni
 †Ptychosyca
 †Ptychosyca inornata
 †Ptychotrygon
 †Ptychotrygon vermiculata
 †Pugnellus
 †Pugnellus densatus
 †Pugnellus goldmani
 Pulvinites
 †Pulvinites argenteus
 Punctiscala
 †Punctiscala melaniea
  Pycnodonte
 †Pycnodonte belli
 †Pycnodonte mutabilis
 †Pycnodonte vesiculare
 †Pycnodonte vesicularis
 †Pyrifusus
 †Pyrifusus sinuocostatus
 †Pyrifusus subdensatus
 †Pyropsis
 †Pyropsis cornutus
 †Pyropsis interstriatus
 †Pyropsis perlata
 †Pyropsis prolixa

R

 †Rachiosoma
 †Rachiosoma mortoni
 †Radiopecten
 †Radiopecten mississippiensis
 †Raninella
 †Raninella tridens
 †Reginaites
 †Reginaites exilis – type locality for species
 †Reginaites leei
 †Remera
 †Remera flexicostata
 †Remera microstriata
 †Remera stephensoni
 †Remnita
 †Remnita anomalocostata
 †Rhombopsis
 †Rhombopsis molinoensis
  Ringicula
 †Ringicula clarki
 †Ringicula pulchella
 †Ringicula yochelsoni

S

 †Sargana
 †Sargana stantoni
 †Sassia
 †Sassia carlea
 †Scambula
 †Scambula perplana
  †Scapanorhynchus
 †Scapanorhynchus texanus
  †Scaphites
 †Scaphites leei
 †Sclerorhynchus
 †Scobinidola
 †Scobinidola guttatus
 Seila
 †Seila quadrilirata
 Serpula
 †Solariorbis
 †Solariorbis clara
 †Solenoceras
 †Solyma
 †Solyma levis
  †Sphenodiscus
 †Sphenodiscus beecheri
 †Sphenodiscus lobatus
 †Sphenodiscus pleurisepta
 †Spinaptychus
 Spondylus
  Squalicorax
 †Squalicorax kaupi
 †Stantonella
 †Stantonella interrupta
 †Stantonella ripleyana
 †Stephanophyllia
 †Stephanophyllia cribraria
 Stosicia
 †Stosicia antiqua
 †Streptacis – tentative report
 †Streptacis bogradi
 Striarca
 †Striarca prebrevis
 †Striarca richardsi
 †Striarca saffordi
 †Striarca umbonata
 †Striaticostatum
 †Striaticostatum asperum
 †Striaticostatum bexarense
 †Striaticostatum congestum
 †Striaticostatum griffini
 †Striaticostatum harbisoni
 †Striaticostatum micropunctatum
 †Striaticostatum sparsum
 Sulcoretusa
 †Sulcoretusa spinosa
 †Syncyclonema
 †Syncyclonema simplicius

T

 

 Teinostoma
 †Teinostoma prenanum
  Tellina
 †Tellinimera
 †Tellinimera buboana
 †Tellinimera gabbi
 †Tenea
 †Tenea parilis
 †Tenuipteria
 †Tenuipteria argentea
 †Tenuipteria argenteus
 †Tetracarcinus
 †Tetracarcinus subquadratus
 †Texanites
 †Texanites gallicus
 Thracia
 †Thylacus
 †Thylacus cretaceus
 †Titanosarcolites
 †Tornatellaea
 †Tornatellaea cretacea
 †Tornus – tentative report
 †Tornus planocarinatus
 †Trachybaculites
 †Trachybaculites columna
  Trachycardium
 †Trachycardium carolinensis
 †Trachycardium eufaulensis
 Trichotropis
 †Trichotropis mississippiensis
 †Trichotropis squamosa
  †Trigonia
  †Trigonostoma
 †Trigonostoma ripleyana
 †Trobus
 †Trobus buboanus
 †Trobus corona
 Trochocyathus
 †Trochocyathus speciosus – type locality for species
 †Tundora
 †Tundora tuberculata
 †Turbinopsis
 †Turbinopsis curta – or unidentified comparable form
 Turboella
 †Turboella crebricostata
 †Turrilites
 †Turrilites peruviana – or unidentified comparable form
  Turritella
 †Turritella bilira
 †Turritella chalybeatensis
 †Turritella chapelvillensis
 †Turritella hilgardi
 †Turritella howelli
 †Turritella paravertebroides
 †Turritella quadrilira
 †Turritella tippana
 †Turritella trilira
 †Turritella vertebroides
 †Tympanotonus
 †Tympanotonus trilirus

U

 †Uddenia
 †Unicardium
 †Unicardium concentricum
 †Urceolabrum
 †Urceolabrum mantachieensis
 †Urceolabrum tuberculatum
 †Urceolabrum tuberculatum callistum

V

 †Variseila
 †Variseila meeki
 †Veniella
 †Veniella conradi
 †Vetericardiella
 †Vetericardiella crenalirata
 †Vetericardiella webbervillensis
 †Volutomorpha
 †Volutomorpha aspera
 †Volutomorpha dumasensis
 †Volutomorpha producta
 †Volutomorpha retifera
 †Volutomorpha splendida
 †Volutomorpha valida

W

 †Weeksia
 †Weeksia amplificata
 †Weeksia deplanata

X

  †Xiphactinus
 †Xiphactinus audax

Z

 †Zikkuratia
 †Zikkuratia tabanneensis

References
 

Mississippi
Mesozoic
Mesozoic